Kaipattoor is a  small town in Vallicode panchayat  of Pathanamthitta district  in Kerala, India. Kaipattoor (also spelled Kaippattoor, Kaippattor and Kaippattur) is located in the western part of Pathanamthitta district. It is 6 kilometers from the district headquarters Pathanamthitta at south east direction. It is watered by the  Achenkovil river. The village is under Vallicode Panchayat.

Location
Kaipattoor is 102 km north of the state capital Thiruvananthapuram. The nearest towns are Pathanamthitta (6km) in the north-east, Adoor (10km) in the south, Pandalam (9km) on the west,  and Konni (15km) on the east.

One can reach Kaippattoor from Pathanamthitta by NH 183 A. It is 6 km from Pathanamthitta, 9 km from Pandalam  and 10 km from Adoor. The nearest railway stations are at Chengannur (25km).

The Kaipattoor Theruvu (Kadav)(East) near the old ferry service was the downtown in Kaipattoor for a very long time till Kaipattoor bridge was constructed. Its significance is now reduced due to the construction of Concrete bridge which came 40 years ago. Earlier, it was a busy market place selling all kinds of house hold items but the centre of trade and business has now shifted to the junction at West. This junction in Malayalam is called "Padinjare Mukh".

Politics
Kaippattoor is part of Konni Assembly constituency and Pathanamthitta Lok Sabha constituency.

Etymology

The place as Kaipattoor which means "place of relatives"കൈപെട്ടവരിൻ ദേശം or  കൈപെട്ടവരിൻ ഊര് .

Churches and temples in Kaipattoor

St Ignatius Orthodox MahaEdavaka 
St Ignatius Orthodox Maha Edavaka, Kaipattoor is church of Malankara Orthodox Sabha in Thumpamon Diocese. Present Parish comprises 776 households. In the number of households the church stands second in Thumpamon Diocese. And in all the religious activities the church. This church  was built in 1850. It was declared as 'Maha Idavaka' in 2009. The church has a "RAASA" every year in the month of December.

St.Georges OCYM 
The St. Georges OCYM of our parish meets every Sunday after the Holy Qurbana. The sessions consist of prayer, bible reading, devotional songs, classes/speeches, quizzes, personality development programmes, games, entertainment programs etc. Various activities include activities such as educational events, cultural and sports activities (Youth Carnival), youth camps, blood donation camps and various charity events. Lijo M Loyid is the Vice President and Titu V. Philip is the Secretary

St.Thomas OCYM 
ST Thomas OCYM is a spiritual and charitable Organization under St. Ignatius Orthodox Maha Edavaka, started in 1981, with the objectives of worship, study, and service. Youth movement has completed 30 years of service to the people who are in distress and destitute. ST. Thomas OCYM charity works mainly concentrating to Medical, Education, Marriage, Housing and General Aids.

St Gregorios Kurushinmoodu 
The "Kurushinmoodu" in Kaippattoor west on kaipatoor-pandalam road prayers are held every Friday evening. It is called Parumala Kurish locally.

St George's Kurushinmoodu (Thekke Kurishu) 
The "Kurushinmoodu" in Kaippattoor North on Kaipatoor-Adoor road. Prayers are held. This is the Kurishaddi where every rasa of St Ignatius Mahaedavaka touches.

St. George's Mount Chappel' 
This chapel is the part of St. Ignatius Orthodox Maha Edavaka, St George's mount OCYM is functioning in this Chappel

St Ignatius Jacobite Syrian Church 
This church was built in early 1950 and before that parish members here was the in kaipattor and manjinikkara church. This church is known as the Kutti Palli.

Muppudathi Amman Kovil Temple 
A temple situated on the banks of  Achenkovil river, an idol with three faces- very rare in kerala, .

Transport

Kaipattoor is well connected to neighboring cities via several roads. It is a node in the Trivandrum - Pathanamthitta Route connecting two district headquarters. The main arterial road is NH 183 A (Adoor to Vandiperiyar). Pathanamthitta – Adoor 16-km stretch is upgraded to National Highway Standards for two-lane traffic which connects Kaipattoor to State Highway 1 (MC Road). The 9-km stretch Kaipattoor- Pandalam road is another road connecting Kaipattoor to  MC Road. Kaipattoor Kadav Junction - Konni road connects to Main Eastern Highway via Thazhoorkadavu, Poonkav.  From Kaipattoor Thekke Kurishu, Ezhamkulam road starts via Chandanapally, Kodumon which connects it to SH 5 (KP Road)

Public transport 
The primary form of public transport within the town is largely dependent on privately owned bus networks. Private busses are frequently available to places like Adoor, Ezhamkulam, Pandalam, Mavelikara, Haripad, Kayamkulam etc. The state-run busses (KSRTC)also operates its services in Kaipattoor . The major bus halts are Padinjare Jn, Kadav Jn, Thekke Kurishu in Adoor route and Parumala kurishu in Pandalam route. KSRTC also has long distant Super Fast and Fast passenger services from Pathanamthitta to places like Trivandrum, Kollam, Kottarakara via Kaipattoor. KSRTC owned venad buses also do chain services from Pathanamthitta to Kollam and Haripad via Kaipattoor.

Schools and Colleges

 Govt. LP School Kaipattoor (Kochupallikoodam)
 Kaipattoor Vocational Higher Secondary School
 St Gregorios Senior Secondary School - Affiliated to CBSE 
 St George's Mount High School
 Indra Gandhi Open University

Law and Order 
 Police Aidpost. It's headquarters of Forensics department of Pathanamthitta. Upgrading to District Police Club for PTA

Temples
The area has a few old temples:

Muppudathi Amman Kovil 
A temple situated near Pathanamthitta-Adoor Road and on the banks of Achenkovil river, an idol with three faces- very rare in kerala

Koyikkal Temple 
A small temple situated on the banks of Achenkovil river near Pandalam-Pathanamthitta Road.

Kaippattoor-Vayalavadakku Sree Indilayappan Temple 
Shri Indilayappan temple, Kaippattoor-Vayalavadakku is one of the oldest and famous temples in Kerala, India. The temple is the abode of Lord Indilayappan the incarnation of two divine powers of Lord Shiva and Lord Dharma Shasta. Situated in the backdrop of scenic beauty and adorned by sacred Grove, all weather clear water ponds and vast evergreen meadow, the temple is an embodiment of serenity and peace. Seated in the lap of Mother Nature, the deity is in the form of a naturally grown Black Rock. The deity has free access to sunlight, air, rain, mist and dew. This is made possible by leaving the overhead portion of the Sreekovil open.

See also 
 Pathanamthitta
 Pandalam
 Vallicode
 Omallur
 Vazhamuttom
 Chandanapally
 kodumon
 Nariyapuram

References

External links
 Kaipattoor Facebook Page
 Kaipattoor Facebook Group

Villages in Pathanamthitta district